St Germans and Landulph was an electoral division of Cornwall in the United Kingdom which returned one member to sit on Cornwall Council between 2013 and 2021. It was abolished at the 2021 local elections, being succeeded by Lynher, Saltash Trematon and Landrake and Rame Peninsula and St Germans.

Councillors

Extent
St Germans and Landulph represented the villages of Trerulefoot, Polbathic, St Germans, Tideford, Landrake, Pillaton, Botusfleming, and the hamlets of Bethany, Budge's Shop, Markwell, St Erney, Hatt, Landulph, Landulph Cross and Cargreen. The division covered 6,128 hectares in total.

Election results

2017 election

2013 election

References

Electoral divisions of Cornwall Council